Sukhobezvodnoye is an urban locality (an urban-type settlement) in Nizhny Novgorod Oblast, Russia. Population:

See also
 Unzhlag - a forced labor camp of the Gulag system located in Sukhobezvodnoye

References

Urban-type settlements in Nizhny Novgorod Oblast
Semyonov Urban Okrug